Swoope is a surname. Notable people with the name include:

 Craig Swoope (born 1964), American football safety
 Erik Swoope (born 1992), American football tight end
 Lawrence Allen Swoope II, also known as Swoope (born 1986), American Christian hip hop artist
 Jacob Swoope (c. 1770–1832), American politician from Virginia
 William Irvin Swoope (1862–1930), American politician from Pennsylvania

See also
 Swoope, Virginia, unincorporated community in Augusta County, United States
 Swoop (disambiguation)
 Sheryl Swoopes (born 1971), retired American professional basketball player